Violent Blue is a feature drama released in 2011 directed by Gregory Hatanaka and starring Silvia Suvadova, Jesse Hlubik, and Nick Mancuso.  Portions of the film are silent with intertitles accompanied with an original music score by Toshiyuki Hiraoka. It was simultaneously shot in English, Polish, and Czech language versions.

Plot
Katarina is a music teacher intent on completing and uncovering the secret behind an unfinished music symphony. She worries about her brother, Ondrej, an introverted electronics inventor who finds himself falling in love with the mysterious student who lives downstairs.  His work is being financed by a nefarious tycoon named Bolo. When Katarina's ex-husband Pietro shows up and imprisons her, locking the woman up in a cage, her brother must question whether to sacrifice himself in order to free her.

Cast

 Silvia Suvadova as Katarina
 Jesse Hlubik as Ondrej
 Nick Mancuso as Pietro
 Barry O'Rourke as Bolo
 Andrea Harrison as Kylie
 Bogdan Szumilas as Dr. Sobeslav

External links
 

2011 films
American drama films
Films shot in Los Angeles
2011 drama films
2010s English-language films
Films directed by Gregory Hatanaka
2010s American films